Nan Xiaoheng (born 23 December 1995) is a Chinese footballer who currently plays for Shijiazhuang Gongfu, on loan from Sichuan Jiuniu in the China League One.

Club career
Nan Xiaoheng started his professional football career when he was promoted to China League One side Shenyang Zhongze's first team squad. On 14 April 2014, he made his senior debut in a 6–0 away win over amateur team Shenyang Riverside in the 2014 Chinese FA Cup. Nan joined hometown club Xinjiang Tianshan Leopard in 2015 after Shenyang Zhongze's dissolution. He was promoted to the first team in the 2016 season. On 12 March 2016, Nan made his debut for the club in a 2–1 away defeat against Shenzhen in the opening match of the season, coming on as a substitute for Tong Xiaoxing in the 69th minute. Nan scored his first and second senior goal on 10 April 2016, in a 3–2 away defeat against Qingdao Huanghai.

Nan transferred to Chinese Super League side Jiangsu Suning in February 2017. He failed to register for official league match due to transfer slot limit and played for reserve team instead. Nan officially joined Jiangsu Suning in 2018. He made his Super League debut on 11 March 2018 in a 2–1 home defeat against Beijing Sinobo Guoan, coming on for Xie Pengfei in the 79th minute.

Career statistics 
.

References

External links
 

1995 births
Living people
Chinese footballers
People from Aksu Prefecture
Footballers from Xinjiang
Xinjiang Tianshan Leopard F.C. players
Jiangsu F.C. players
Sichuan Jiuniu F.C. players
Chinese Super League players
China League One players
Association football forwards